Boris Nikolayevich Delaunay or Delone (15 March 1890 – 17 July 1980) was a Soviet and Russian mathematician, mountain climber, and the father of physicist, Nikolai Borisovich Delone.

The spelling Delone is a straightforward transliteration from Cyrillic he often used in later publications, while Delaunay is the French version he used in the early French and German publications.

Biography
Boris Delone got his surname from his ancestor French Army officer de Launay, who was captured in Russia during Napoleon's invasion of 1812. De Launay was a nephew of the Bastille governor marquis de Launay. He married a woman from the Tukhachevsky noble family and stayed in Russia.

When Boris was a young boy his family spent summers in the Alps where he learned mountain climbing. By 1913, he became one of the top three Russian mountain climbers. After the Russian Revolution, he climbed mountains in the Caucasus and Altai. One of the mountains (4300 m) near Belukha is named after him. In the 1930s, he was among the first to receive a qualification of Master of mountain climbing of the USSR. Future Nobel laureate in physics Igor Tamm was his associate in setting tourist camps in the mountains.

Boris Delaunay worked in the fields of modern algebra, the geometry of numbers. He used the results of Evgraf Fedorov, Hermann Minkowski, Georgy Voronoy, and others in his development of modern mathematical crystallography and general mathematical model of crystals. He invented what is now called Delaunay triangulation in 1934; Delone sets are also named after him. Among his best students are the mathematicians Aleksandr Aleksandrov and Igor Shafarevich.

Delaunay was elected the corresponding member of the Academy of Sciences of the Soviet Union in 1929. Delaunay is credited as being an organizer, in Leningrad in 1934, of the first mathematical olympiad for high school students in the Soviet Union.

Books 
 Delone, B. N.; Raikov, D. A. (1948, 1949). Analytic Geometry (2 vols.). State Technical Press. (in Russian)
 Kolmogorov, Andrey Nikolaevich et al. (1969). Mathematics: Its Content, Methods and Meaning, chapter Analytic Geometry, by B. N. Delone. MIT Press. (translated from the Russian)

References

External links
 Biography (in Russian) on the website of the Moscow State University
 
 
 Boris Nikolaevich Delone (On his seventieth birthday)
 80th Birthday - Reproduction of an article in Russian Mathematical Surveys 26 (1971) 199-203, with the kind permission of the London Mathematical Society Pages 199, 200, 201, 202, 203; Also in PDF format.
 Nikolay P. Dolbilin, The Delone Peak, 2010.

1890 births
1980 deaths
20th-century Russian mathematicians
Mathematicians from Saint Petersburg
People from Sankt-Peterburgsky Uyezd
Corresponding Members of the USSR Academy of Sciences
Members of the German Academy of Sciences Leopoldina
Academic staff of the Moscow Institute of Physics and Technology
Moscow State University alumni
Academic staff of Saint Petersburg State University
Recipients of the Order of Lenin
Recipients of the Order of the Red Banner of Labour
Geometers
Russian people of French descent
Sportspeople from Saint Petersburg
Russian mountain climbers
Soviet mathematicians
Soviet mountain climbers